The 2015 Gloucester City Council election took place on 7 May 2015 to elect members of Gloucester City Council in England. Eleven of the 36 seats on the council were up for election, being a nominal third of the council. This was the last year of Gloucester electing its council by thirds, with elections from 2016 onwards being whole council elections every four years instead. The 2015 election was held on the same day as other local elections. The Conservatives gained two seats, giving them control of the council, which had previously been under no overall control. Paul James, the Conservative leader, continued to serve as leader of the council, but with his party having a majority.

Results
The overall results were as follows:

|}

Ward results
The results in each ward were as follows (candidates with an asterisk* were the previous incumbent standing for re-election):

References

2015 English local elections
May 2015 events in the United Kingdom
2015
2010s in Gloucestershire